Joseph Whipple Jr. (December 30, 1687 - 1750) was a wealthy merchant in the Colony of Rhode Island and Providence Plantations, and a Deputy Governor of the colony.

Life

The son of Col. Joseph Whipple Sr. who was also a merchant, Whipple was born in Providence, the third of 12 children.  He was a ship-owner, dealing in many goods including slaves, and he often traded illicitly with the Spanish and French who were at war with the British. He was considered the wealthiest member of his extended family of merchants, though the full value of his estate is not found in the public record.

In addition to being very wealthy, he married into wealth as well. His first wife, Anne Almy, bore four of his children, all of whom died as infants, she dying less than two weeks after her last child died. He then married Sarah Redwood, the daughter of probable business partner, Abraham Redwood.  Redwood was a merchant, ship-owner, slave-owner and philanthropist who had a large and profitable plantation on Antigua in the West Indies. He was the founder of the Redwood Library in Newport.  With Sarah, Whipple had nine children, the second of whom, Joseph III became Deputy Governor at a very young age, following his father's death. Whipple's will was dated May 28, 1750, and proved on July 2 following, suggesting that he died in June 1750.

See also

 List of lieutenant governors of Rhode Island
 List of colonial governors of Rhode Island
 Colony of Rhode Island and Providence Plantations

References

Bibliography

Further reading

External links
State list of lieutenant governors of Rhode Island

1687 births
1750 deaths
American people of English descent
American slave owners
American slave traders
Politicians from Providence, Rhode Island
People of colonial Rhode Island